Else Hench was an Austrian luger who competed in the late 1920s. She won a bronze medal in the first-ever women's singles event at the 1928 European luge championships at Schreiberhau, Germany (now Szklarska Poręba, Poland).

References
List of European luge champions 

Austrian female lugers
Year of birth missing
Year of death missing
20th-century Austrian women